The National Curriculum for Wales may refer to;

 National Curriculum for Wales (2008 to 2026) - the curriculum currently being phased out 
 Curriculum for Wales (2022 to present) - the curriculum currently being phased in